Kirovets is a rural locality (a settlement) in Kirovskoye Rural Settlement, Sredneakhtubinsky District, Volgograd Oblast, Russia. The population was 723 as of 2010. There are 41 streets.

Geography 
Kirovets is located on the Akhtuba River, 20 km northwest of Srednyaya Akhtuba (the district's administrative centre) by road. Tretya Karta is the nearest rural locality.

References 

Rural localities in Sredneakhtubinsky District